Aminabad (also Romanized as Amīnābād; also known as Ebnvā) is a village in Rudbar-e Qasran Rural District, Rudbar-e Qasran District, Shemiranat County, Tehran Province, Iran. At the 2006 census, its population was 390, in 103 families.

References 

Populated places in Shemiranat County